This article contains a list of fossil-bearing stratigraphic units in the state of Hawaii, U.S.

Sites

See also

 Paleontology in Hawaii
 Lists of fossiliferous stratigraphic units in the United States

References

 

Hawaii
Stratigraphic units
Stratigraphy of Hawaii
Hawaii geography-related lists
United States geology-related lists